Castelli is an Italian surname. Notable people with the surname include:

 Annibale Castelli (c. 1570–c.1620), Italian painter, active near Bologna
 Bernardo Castelli (1557–1629), Italian painter of the late-Mannerist style, active mainly in Genoa and Liguria
 Francesco Castelli Borromini (1599-1667), Italian architect
 Giovanni Battista Castelli (1500 or 1509–1569 or 1579), Italian historical painter
 Matteo Castelli (c. 1555- 1632), Swiss architect
 Teramo Castelli (1597-1659), Italian noble and Roman Catholic Theatine missionary
 Valerio Castelli (1624-1659), pre-eminent Ligurian painters

 Alfredo Castelli (born 1947), Italian comic book author
 Anna Castelli Ferrieri (1918–2006), Italian architect and industrial designer
 Bartolomeo Castelli (1650–1730), Roman Catholic Bishop of Mazara del Vallo 
 Benedetto Castelli (1577–1643), Italian mathematician
 Bernardino Castelli (1750-810), Italian painter of portraits and religious figures
 Bertrand Castelli (1929–2008), French producer, director, lighting designer, choreographer and painter 
 Clino Castelli (born 1944), Italian industrial designer and artist
 Clément Castelli (1870–1959), French painter
 David Castelli (1836–1901), Italian scholar and educator in the field of secular Jewish studies
 Davide Castelli (born 1999), Italian footballer
 Enrico Castelli (1909–1983), Italian basketball player 
 Facundo Castelli (born 1995), Argentine professional footballer
 Gaetano Castelli (born 1938), Italian painter and set designer
 Giovanni Paolo Castelli (1659–1730), Italian painter, active in Rome 
 Giuseppe Castelli (born 1919), Italian former footballer
 Giuseppe Castelli (footballer) (born 1919), Italian professional football player.
 Guido Castelli (born 1965), Italian lawyer and politician
 Henri Castelli, artistic name of Henri Lincoln Fernandes Nascimento (born 1978), Brazilian actor and model
 Ignaz Franz Castelli, (1780–1862), Austrian dramatist
 Irene Castelli (born 1983), Italian gymnast
 Jeffrey W. Castelli, CIA officer
 Juan José Castelli (1764–1812), Member of the first national government of Argentina
 Laura Castelli (born 1986), Italian politician
 Leo Castelli (1907–1999), American art dealer
 Luciano Castelli (born 1951), Swiss painter, graphic artist, photographer, sculptor and musician
 María Castelli (born 1972), Argentine former field hockey player
 Marissa Castelli (born 1990), American pair skater
 Michelangelo Castelli (1808–1875), Italian politician
 Nino Castelli (1898–1925), Italian rower
 Paolo Castelli (born 1980), Italian footballer
 Pietro Castelli (1574–1662), Italian physician and botanist
 Raimondo Castelli (died 1670), Roman Catholic Bishop of Narni
 Richard Castelli (born 1961), producer, artistic consultant 
 Roberto Castelli (boxer) (born 1969), Italian boxer
 Roberto Castelli (born 1946), former Italian Minister of Justice
 Samuel Castelli (born 1985), Mexican singer

Italian-language surnames